The anti-nuclear movement in Kazakhstan, "Nevada Semipalatinsk", was formed in 1989 and was one of the first major anti-nuclear movements in the former Soviet Union. It was led by author Olzhas Suleimenov and attracted thousands of people to its protests and campaigns which eventually led to the closure of the nuclear test site at Semipalatinsk in north-east Kazakhstan in 1991. The movement was named "Nevada Semipalatinsk" in order to show solidarity with similar movement in the west of the United States aiming to close the Nevada Test Site.

The Soviet Union conducted 456 nuclear weapons tests at the Semipalatinsk Test Site, between 1949 and 1989. The United Nations believes that one million people around Semipalatinsk were exposed to radiation, and the incidence of birth defects and cancer is much higher than for the rest of the country.

According to UNESCO, Nevada-Semipalatinsk played a positive role in promoting public understanding of "the necessity to fight against nuclear threats". The movement gained global support and, became "a real historical factor in finding solutions to global ecological problems".

Astana hosted an international conference Building a Nuclear-Weapons-Free World in August 2016. The topics of the conference included nuclear non-proliferation and disarmament and the physical protection of nuclear weapons. The main outcome of the conference was the adoption of The Astana Vision Declaration “From а Radioactive Haze to a Nuclear-Weapon-Free World.”

See also

Semipalatinsk Test Site
Downwinders
Kazatomprom
Energy policy of Kazakhstan
List of anti-nuclear power groups
List of books about nuclear issues
List of Chernobyl-related articles
List of nuclear whistleblowers
List of Nuclear-Free Future Award recipients

References

External links
Nuclear politics and the future security of Kazakhstan

Kazakhstan
Political movements in Kazakhstan
Nuclear technology in Kazakhstan
Protests in Kazakhstan
Anti-nuclear movement in the Soviet Union